Gary Phillips (born 9 June 1963) is an Australian football coach and former professional soccer player, who is coach of the Cook Islands women's national team.

Playing career
A central midfielder, Phillips played for more than a decade with Sydney Olympic in the National Soccer League before joining Brisbane Strikers, winning titles with both clubs. He retired after the 1996–1997 season.

Coaching career
As a coach, Phillips was in charge of Sydney Olympic in the 2001–2002 and 2002–2003 seasons, winning the title in 2001–2002, before he was extraordinarily dismissed the following season.

Phillips was the inaugural coach of Newcastle Jets during the 2008–09 W-League season.

After working in a coaching capacity for the Asian Football Confederation in Kuala Lumpur, Phillips took over as head coach and technical director of Malaysian Premier League side Sabah FA in December 2009 and guided the team to Super League promotion in 7 months. After a tough start to life in the Super League as the team was rocked by injury and forced to play eight of their first 12 matches on the road, Phillips was dismissed on 5 May 2011, replaced by former Sabah player and coach of Sabah President's Cup team Justin Ganai.

In February 2015, he took over as manager of Papua New Guinea women's national football team.

Shortly following the conclusion of the 2015 Malaysia Premier League season, Phillips returned to Malaysia and signed a contract with NS Matrix F.C. Some of his first signings were all former A-League players.

He coached the Davao Aguilas during the 2017 season until he was replaced midseason in September 2017 by Marlon Maro.

In July 2019, Phillips was appointed Technical Director for the Nepal national team. He was signed on a one-year contract, with his salary paid by the Asian Football Confederation.

Phillips was appointed coach of the Nepal women's national team in February, 2021.

In May, 2022, he was appointed coach of the Cook Islands national women's team.

Television
Gary currently is an occasional football pundit on Malaysian television network Astro and its twice weekly FourFourTwo TV Show, and also Fox Sports in Australia.

Honours

Club 
As coach
 Olympic Sharks
 National Soccer League Premier: 2002–03
 National Soccer League Champion: 2001–02
Sawty Scorpions 2016-

References

External links

1963 births
Sportsmen from New South Wales
Association football midfielders
Soccer players from Sydney
Australian expatriate soccer players
National Soccer League (Australia) players
Sydney Olympic FC players
Expatriate footballers in Malaysia
Sabah F.C. (Malaysia) managers
Living people
Australian expatriate soccer coaches
Tonga national football team managers
Expatriate football managers in Vietnam
Philippines Football League head coaches
Davao Aguilas F.C. managers
Australian soccer players
Expatriate football managers in the Philippines
Australian expatriate sportspeople in Vietnam
Australian expatriate sportspeople in Nepal
Australian expatriate sportspeople in Tonga
Expatriate football managers in Tonga
Australian expatriate sportspeople in the Philippines
Australian expatriate sportspeople in Malaysia
Expatriate football managers in Malaysia
Expatriate football managers in Papua New Guinea
Australian expatriate sportspeople in Papua New Guinea
Women's national association football team managers